Bridgeport Speedway is a dirt speedway located in the community of Bridgeport in Logan Township, Gloucester County, New Jersey, that consists of a high banked, progressive 4/10 mile  and a 1/4 mile  oval located within the bigger track. The Super DIRTcar Series races at the track. Jason Leffler died in an accident at the track in 2013.

History
Doug Hoffman owned the track until his death in 2013. A team ran the track until Doug Rose was named the owner in 2019. Rose saw the construction of a new 4/10 mile outer track before the 2020 season.

Weekly racing divisions
The speedway features big block modifieds, crate/sportsman modifieds, and street stocks every Saturday night throughout the racing season. In addition, sprint cars race at Bridgeport Speedway on various dates during the racing season. Bridgeport Speedway features other racing divisions including slingshots, mod lites, stage-1 mods, and vintage cars.

Special events
The Super DIRTcar Series holds an annual event at the track. The World of Outlaws sprint cars were scheduled to race at the track in 2018 for the first time in 15 years but the event rained out. The series ran on the track in 2019 and it was won by Danny Dietrich. The USAC Midgets held their first race at Bridgeport on August 5, 2021; Tanner Thorson won the event.

Gallery

References

External links

Official website

Buildings and structures in Gloucester County, New Jersey
Motorsport venues in New Jersey
Logan Township, New Jersey
Tourist attractions in Gloucester County, New Jersey